The Antarctic Treaties Act, 1996 (Act No. 60 of 1996) is a South African statute that incorporates the Antarctic Treaty System into national law. It provides that the Antarctic Treaty, the Protocol on Environmental Protection (PEP), the Convention for the Conservation of Antarctic Seals, and the Convention for the Conservation of Antarctic Marine Living Resources all form part of South African law.

The act was enacted because of South Africa's ratification of the PEP in 1995, as well as the increase in Antarctic tourism. It asserts South African jurisdiction over treaty violations by South African citizens and permanent residents, as well as members of expeditions organised in South Africa, subject to exceptions for expeditions by foreign governments. It makes violations of treaty provisions criminal offences and sets maximum sentences for them. For the purposes of enforcement it places Antarctica within the jurisdiction of the magistrate's court at Cape Town.

See also
 Crime in Antarctica
 Antarctic Treaty System
 South African Citizens in Antarctica Act, 1962

References

External links
 Text of the act

South African legislation
Environmental law in South Africa
1996 in South African law
South Africa and the Antarctic